Parosphromenus harveyi is a species of gourami endemic to Malaysia, where it is only known from Selangor. The most extreme freshwater habitats in Peninsular Malaysia is the peat swamp forest that consist of dark-coloured and highly acidic waters. Parosphromenus harveyi is known as licorice gourami, small labyrinth fishes located within the north Selangor peat swamp forest from the Tanjong Malim area in neighbouring Perak state at least one population distribution that exhibit a wide variety of morphological and behavioural traits. Species of the osphronemid genus Parosphromenus (usually <30 mm SL) that stenotypic inhabitant of peat swamp forests and associated black water streams which has a very little light penetrates. Parosphromenus was established by Brown, 1987. Since 1950s, the additional taxa have been described on a sporadic basis and there are 20 recognised members at present.

Etymology 
The generic name is a compound of para meaning "near", "similar to" and Osphronemusa name coined by Philibert Commerson meaning "olfactory", a reference to its labyrinth organ, which Commerson thought was an olfactory organ. The person honoured in the specific name is thought to be the German born aquarist Will Harvey (1916-2013) who settled in Scotland after World War II and whose obituary Brown wrote.

Discovery / First Import 
A. und B. Brown to Europe 1984 and 1985

Common name / Other name 
 Common name: Turkoosigurami in Finland (Finnish language)

Other name: Ornate paradisefish and Harvey Licourice Gourami

Physical characteristics / Morphology 
Short description (Physical characteristics)

 Dorsal spines (total) : 11-13
 Dorsal soft rays (total) : 5-7
 Anal spines : 11-13
 Anal soft rays : 8-11
 Maximum length : 30–35 mm

Morphology

They have a round-tail-type. Body shape lateral is elongated. In nuptial plumage, the male is distinguished from most of the other round-tailed licorice gouramis (with the exception of the Bintan complex) by the absence of any red portions in its colour and its striking iridescent blue-green luminescent bands in the unpaired fins. Another characteristic for this species is also the black band at the edge of its tail fin that is wider than in most of the other similar types. The differentiation of the female from the other round tail-type species is problematic as usual. During courtship the female gets the species-typical pale colour while the otherwise glass-clear transparent unpaired fins take on a brownish colour.

Ecology/habitat/environment: depth range 
Mostly, Parosphromenus harveyi lives in the freshwater; pelagic; migratory; tropical.

Ecology: Mangrove.

Biology: Inhabits peat swamp forest

Habitat: Black water stream

Water depth: Range from about 30 to 160 cm with the fluctuating rainfall

Distribution 
Asia: Selangor, Bernam, Malaysia.

Distribution: Tanjung Malim, Perak

FAO areas where Parosphromenus harveyi occurs : Asia - inland waters (endemic)

Ecosystems where Parosphromenus harveyi occurs: Oriental ecosystem in zoogeographic realm (endemic)

Occurrence record 

 North Selangor peat swamp forest (blackwater streams).
 Along the on trunk road between Kampung Sungai Besar and Tanjung Malim.
 West Malaysia, type locality Batu Arang. (this wetland area is now largely destroyed. The species still exists in suitable remnants of marshes of the formerly large jungle of Selangor – about 100 km North of Batu Arang)

Mating 
Mating behaviour of the true Parosphromenus harveyi is their distinct head-down courtship. Good pairs mate, spawn and brood care almost continuously if the conditions are suitable. Medium-size clutches.

Many of the August/September males shown to be in full breeding colouration. This condition suggests that there is probably a higher incidence of breeding in this species during low water.

Reproduction 
Parosphromenus spp. have been grouped arbitrarily based on courtship behaviour in males which adopt a 'head-down', 'head-up', or 'horizontal' position depending on species. Normally spawns in small caves or among leaf litter and forms temporary pair bonds with the male solely responsible for egg and brood-care. P. harveyi belongs to the former, more species, assemblage in which the male assumes a near-vertical position with the head lowermost and fins splayed during nuptial displays. Sexually-active males form small territories at the centre of which is a small cave normally formed from leaf litter in nature. They then attempt to attract females in the vicinity to enter the cave via spectacular. Eggs and milt are released in batches during a series of embraces in which the male wraps its body around that of the female. Some males construct a rudimentary bubble nest inside the cave while others do not, but either both male and female attempt to attach the eggs to the ceiling after they are released. Subsequent spawning embraces may dislodge eggs from the roof of the cave, and inexperienced adults sometimes simply eat them so a degree of patience may be required until the fish get things right. Following a successful spawn the female leaves the cave and proceeds to defend the surrounding area while the male tends to the brood. Incubation is normally 24–36 hours with the fry mobile around 4–6 days later. They initially swim without direction and the male will collect and return them to the 'nest' but after 3–5 additional days are fully free-swimming and leave the cave at which point parental care ceases.

Diet / feeding 
This particular species eats live-food such as baby mosquito, grindal worm, daphnia insects, benth. Copepods, ostracods other annelids. According to Ifish Malaysia observation of their captured P. harveyi, this fish only eat live-food and most of the dried food given were refused.  This species is chiefly a micropredator feeding on tiny aquatic invertebrates, therefore in the aquarium it must be offered a variety of small live foods such as Artemia nauplii, Daphnia, Moina, mosquito larvae, micro worm, etc. Frozen foods are sometimes accepted but not considered sufficiently nutritious while the majority of dried products are normally refused.

Care / Breeding 
This species is very sensitive to the air. They cannot be exposed to the air directly (which will most likely happened during their transportation) because the surface of their body will get scalded.  Their maintenance requirement for breeding pair is the tank must be at least 10 inch, with addition of some dried leaves and hidden pipe for their hiding place. Water change is recommended to be done around 10–20%, once every one or two week.

The water conditions are as below where the temperature is between 22 and 28oC with the pH of 3.0 to 3.8.

Typical black water region licorice gourami. pH should not exceed 6.0, but may be at 4.0. Rather low (22-24 oC) temperatures (not 27/28 oC). Conductivity of the water should be definitely less than 100 micro Siemens/cm, KH should not be detectable. Clutches often have more than 40 eggs. Foam nest usually consists of only a few bubbles. Not a beginner's fish.

Economic / Ecological value 
P. harveyi is important for the ichthyofaunal in black water or peat swamp area. It also has a good potential for the aquarium trade due to its rarity and beautiful appearance. P. harveyi could be one of those species demanded species for the trade for its colourful and exotic characteristics even its status is currently fall under category of endangered species. Endangered species could be traded under control between countries with the purpose of giving awareness for society on the importance of animal conservation.

Threat

Threat to species 
Very high

After the type locality has been dried up almost completely, deforested and thus made barely inhabitable for licorice gouramis, the species appears to have adjourned into the formerly extended nature protection area "Selangor Forest". But despite its protected status this area too has been drained in large parts and has been transformed to plantations.  P. harveyi tries to survive in some of the drainage canals and in remaining black water swamps of the relict jungle.

Threat to human 
Harmless

Trade 
The species appeared very rarely in trade; even less frequently after the almost entire destruction of its habitat. Most of the fish, distributed among hobbyist, go back to a few private imports. Because of the risk of confusion with the frequently traded specie of the bintan-group (spec. "blue line" etc.), fish labelled as "harveyi" should be examined more closely. On the other hand, it has real harveyi may have been traded under the wrong appellation "deissneri" (probably from captive breeding in the hobby).

References

Sources
 
 
 
 
 
 

 
 

Endemic fauna of Malaysia
Freshwater fish of Malaysia
harveyi
Fish described in 1987
Taxonomy articles created by Polbot